McAlister Square is a repositioned shopping mall in Greenville, South Carolina. It is notable for being the first enclosed shopping center in South Carolina, and the largest shopping center in the state at the time it was built. It is now a hybrid property, containing a campus of Greenville Technical College.

History 
The mall was first announced in December 1965. Construction of the mall began in June 1967, with what was termed "Phase One" of the mall, with anchors Meyers-Arnold (63,000 sq ft) and Ivey's (60,000 sq ft) and 245,000 sq ft of interior space and an opening date of early 1968. "Phase Two", also announced at this time, was to include a third anchor, a "convenience center", and a theater, for a total of 600,000 sq ft of space by 1970. Meyers-Arnold and Ivey's opened on February 15, 1968, with completion of the mall anticipated for March 18th, for a March 25th opening. At this time, a majority of tenants had been announced, including junior anchors S. H. Kress & Co. and Walgreens Drug. The mall opened in 1968, featuring anchor stores Ivey's and Meyers-Arnold. A Winn-Dixie grocery store, movie theater and bank branch were outparcels.

Decline
In 1990, the Ivey's store was converted into a Dillard's, and the store closed in 1995, when Dillard's relocated to Haywood Mall.  Belk-Simpson would announce their closure in October 1998, and would close in January 1999.  The Upton's anchor, which had replaced the Meyers-Arnold store, closed shortly thereafter.

Current use
The mall is owned by Greenville Technical College and the University Center of Greenville.  While little of the space in the main mall continues to be used as retail space, the outparcels consist of a Publix grocery store, a Camelot movie theater, a BB&T bank branch and other retailers. South Carolina's first freestanding Chick-fil-A, which opened in the 1990s when the mall also had a Chick-fil-A at center court, is still in business along Laurens Road.  The mall has been repainted and re-landscaped since its transformation into a mixed-use center.

References

External links
University Center of Greenville; History; Growth and Change
 DeadMalls.Com: McAlister Square article

Shopping malls in South Carolina
Shopping malls established in 1968
Buildings and structures in Greenville, South Carolina
Defunct shopping malls in the United States